The painted wood turtle  or spot-legged wood turtle  (Rhinoclemmys punctularia) is a species of turtle belonging to the genus Rhinoclemmys of the family Geoemydidae.

Distribution 
The painted wood turtle can be found in Brazil, French Guiana, Guyana, Suriname, Trinidad and Tobago and Venezuela.

Subspecies 
Rhinoclemmys punctularia punctularia
Rhinoclemmys punctularia flammigera

References

Bibliography 
 
 

Rhinoclemmys
Turtles of South America
Reptiles of Brazil
Reptiles of French Guiana
Reptiles of Guyana
Reptiles of Suriname
Reptiles of Trinidad and Tobago
Reptiles of Venezuela
Reptiles described in 1801